Live in Sevilla 2000 is a live album by Masada recorded in Seville, Spain.

Reception
The Allmusic review by Sean Westergaard awarded the album 5 stars stating "This might also be the best recorded of the live Masada releases, making it a real jewel in an already glittering discography. Live in Sevilla proves that Masada is one of the most exciting jazz ensembles in the world, bar none".

Track listing
All compositions by John Zorn
 "Ne’eman" – 13:00
 "Katzatz" – 5:09
 "Hadasha" – 11:11
 "Beeroth" – 7:30
 "Shamor" – 10:09 - misidentified as "Yoreh" on album sleeve 
 "Hazor" – 6:47
 "Nashon" – 10:11
 "Lakom" – 5:24
 "Bith Aneth" – 9:35
Recorded live at Teatro Central, Seville (Spain) on March 18, 2000

Personnel
Masada
John Zorn – saxophone
Dave Douglas – trumpet
Greg Cohen – bass
Joey Baron – drums

References

2000 live albums
Albums produced by John Zorn
Masada (band) albums
John Zorn live albums
Tzadik Records live albums